Roger Musgrove "Bill" Hearn (born 4 March 1913) was an Australian rules footballer who played with Richmond in the Victorian Football League (VFL).

Family
The son of Richard William Hearn (1875-1934), and Sarah Jane Hearn (1877-1947), née Dempsey, Roger Musgrove Hearn, known as "Bill", was born at Bungaree, Victoria on 4 March 1913.

Football

Golden Point (BFL)
In 1932 he played 11 games and scored 16 goals for the Golden Point Football Club in the Ballarat Football League (BFL).

South Ballarat (BFL)
In 1933 he transferred to the South Ballarat Football Club in the Ballarat Football League (BFL).

Richmond (VFL)
In 1935 he was eventually cleared to Richmond,  and he played in 6 games, scoring 5 goals, for the First XVIII, and in 8 games, scoring 7 goals, for the Second XVIII. He was also selected to play for Richmond in its exhibition match, against the Tasmanian Football League's representative team, at North Hobart on 3 August 1935; However, at the last minute he was replaced in the team.

South Ballarat (BFL)
Rather unsettled by his return to Ballarat in 1936, he played in one more season with South Ballarat.

Minyip (WFL)
In 1937 he went on to play for the Minyip Football Club — coached by his brother, Donald Michael "Mike" Hearn (1907–1975) — in the Wimmera Football League for three seasons (1937–1939), and was the League's leading goalkicker in 1939, with 41 goals.

Coleraine (WDFL)
In 1940, he was playing with the Coleraine Football Club in the Western District Football League (WDFL).

Notes

References
 
 Hogan P: The Tigers Of Old, Richmond FC, (Melbourne), 1996. : note that Hogan, at p.97, has him as Hearne.
 World War Two Nominal Roll: Private William Hearn (VX61457), Department of Veterans' Affairs.
 A41, 46330: "HEARN William (Private): Service Number - VX61457: Unit - 2/23rd Australian Infantry Battalion, Australian Infantry Battalion: Date of Court Martial - 17 December 1942" (documents not yet examined for release), National Archives of Australia.
 A471, 47957: "HEARN William (Private): Service Number - VX61457: Unit - 2/23rd Australian Infantry Battalion, Australian Military Forces: Date of Court Martial - 29 August 1943" (documents not yet examined for release), National Archives of Australia.
 B883, VX61457: World War Two Service Record: Private William Hearn (VX61457), National Archives of Australia.

External links 

1913 births
Year of death missing
Australian rules footballers from Victoria (Australia)
Golden Point Football Club players
South Ballarat Football Club players
Richmond Football Club players
Minyip Football Club players